Aissata Traoré (born 9 September 1997) is a Malian footballer who plays as a forward for French Division 1 Féminine club En Avant de Guingamp and the Mali women's national team.

Career

Club
Traoré played for AS Super Lionness in her country before she was loaned out to the Istanbul-based club Beşiktaş J.K. for the second half of the 2018-19 Turkish Women's First Football League season. She enjoyed the champion title of her team in the 2018–19 season.

International
She was called up to the Mali national team, and took part at the 2018 Africa Women Cup of Nations held in Ghana. She played in five matches and scored one goal.

Career statistics
.

Honours
Turkish Women's First Football League
Beşiktaş J.K.
 Winners (1): 2018–19

References

External links
 
 

1997 births
Living people
Sportspeople from Bamako
Malian women's footballers
Women's association football forwards
Beşiktaş J.K. women's football players
En Avant Guingamp (women) players
Division 1 Féminine players
Turkish Women's Football Super League players
Mali women's international footballers
Malian expatriate footballers
Malian expatriate sportspeople in Turkey
Expatriate women's footballers in Turkey
Malian expatriate sportspeople in France
Expatriate women's footballers in France
21st-century Malian people